The 1983 Golden Bay Earthquakes season was the tenth for the Earthquakes franchise in the North American Soccer League.  They finished second in
the Western Division and defeated the Chicago Sting in the playoff quarterfinals. The Earthquakes' run came to an end in the semifinals when the Toronto Blizzard earned
two shutout wins.

Squad
The 1983 squad

Competitions

NASL

Match results

Season

Playoffs 

* = ShootoutSource:

Standings

References

External links
The Year in American Soccer – 1983 | NASL
San Jose Earthquakes Game Results | Soccerstats.us
San Jose Earthquakes Rosters | nasljerseys.com

San Jose Earthquakes seasons
Golden Bay
Golden Bay
1983 in sports in California